Portopia '81 (Japanese: 神戸ポートアイランド博覧会), also abbreviated "Portopia", was an exhibition in Japan held at Port Island and March 20 - September 15, 1981.

Its theme was "Creation of a New Cultural City on the Sea". Portopia was organized to commemorate the opening of Port Island. It was visited by over 16 million people.

Pavilions
Theme Pavilion 
Hyogo Prefecture Pavilion
Kobe Pavilion
Kawasaki Steel Earth Pavilion
Kobe Steel Portorama Pavilion
Suntory Water Land
Midori Pavilion - Sanwa Group.
Kobe Planetarium Theater
Daiei Pavilion Omnimax Theater
Sumitomo Pavilion
Mitsubishi Pavilion
IBM Kentoshi Pavilion
Sanyo Solarium
KEPCO Future Energy Pavilion
Osaka Gas Wonderland
UCC Coffee Pavilion
Fuyo Group Pavilion Green Air Dome
Heartpia
Mitsui Group Pavilion
Solar Pyramid Matsushita Pavilion
Fresh Life '81
Fashion Live Theater
Minami Galathee Pavilion
Tobacco & Salt Paviion - Japan Tobacco and Salt Public Corporation.
Port Oasis
Amateur Radio Pavilion - Japan Amateur Radio League.
International Pavilion No.1
United Arab Emirates
State of Paraná
State of Washington
Finland
United Nations
International Pavilion No.2
West Germany
Bulgaria
Rotterdam
Marseille
Riga
UNESCO
South Pacific Pavilion - Australia,Solomon Islands,Tuvalu,Tonga,West Samoa,Vanuatu,Papua New Guinea,Fiji,Hawaii,Northern Mariana Islands,Guam,New Caledonia,and French Polynesia shared the same booth.
International Communication Pavilion - KDD.
EXPO'85
International Pavilion No.3 - Saudi Ports Authority.
Large exhibition hall - Using the Kobe International Exhibition Hall.
Tianjin Pavilion
Telecom Pavilion - NTT.
Local Government Pavilion
Toban-Yosui Irrigational Canal Pavilion
International Pavilion No.4
Sri Lanka
Mexico
Limited time booth - Philippines,Thailand,Bhutan,Bolivia,and Chile shared the same booth.
Indoor Event Venue - Using the Port Island Sports Center.
Rokko Flood Control Pavilion
Panda Pavilion

Further reading

References 

1981 in Japan
1981 festivals
Exhibitions in Japan
Fairs in Japan
March 1981 events in Asia
April 1981 events in Asia
May 1981 events in Asia
June 1981 events in Asia
July 1981 events in Asia
August 1981 events in Asia
September 1981 events in Asia
History of Hyōgo Prefecture
Kobe